The 2009–10 Missouri Valley Conference men's basketball season marks the 101st season of Missouri Valley Conference basketball.

Preseason
In the preseason, Northern Iowa was the conference favorite – returning all five starters and 9 of the top 10 players from their MVC championship team.  UNI received all but one first-place vote in the preseason poll of MVC coaches, media, and sports information directors.  Creighton received the other first place vote.  The preseason player of the year was 2009 MVC conference tournament MVP Osiris Eldridge of Illinois State – who tested the NBA draft waters over the offseason.

Also in the preseason, three MVC players were named to the Lowe's Senior CLASS Award preseason candidate list: Dodie Dunson of Bradley, Adam Koch of Northern Iowa and Josh Young of Drake.

MVC Preseason Poll

Preseason All-MVC Team
Kwadzo Ahelegbe, Northern Iowa
Osiris Eldridge, Illinois State
Tony Freeman, Southern Illinois
Adam Koch, Northern Iowa
P'Allen Stinnett, Creighton
Josh Young, Drake

Preseason Player of the Year 
Osiris Eldridge, Illinois State

Regular season

Non-conference
Bradley was dealt a tough blow in their season opener as, for the fourth consecutive season, the Braves suffered an injury to a key player.  Senior guard Dodie Dodson broke two bones in his forearm in Bradley's home opener against Idaho State.  Bradley won the game, 74–69, but likely lost Dodson for the season. In another memorable opening games, Creighton hung tough at number 21 Dayton, but ultimately lost down the stretch 70–60.  The Bluejays led 46–41 at the half and were within 3 points with 2 minutes left to play.  Jake Kelly also made his debut for Indiana State, scoring 16 in an 88–58 win over Nebraska-Kerney.  Kelly transferred to Indiana State from Iowa to be closer to home after the death of his mother.

Mountain West – Missouri Valley Challenge
The Missouri Valley Conference won the inaugural challenge with 6 wins to the Mountain West's 4 wins. 2009 marked the inaugural year of the Mountain West - Missouri Valley Challenge – matching teams from the MVC against teams from the Mountain West Conference in an effort to bolster strength of schedule for both leagues.  Match-ups were set in January 2009 and were based on 2008–09 preseason projections. 
 November 13: Bradley @ BYU – Bradley L 60–70
 November 20: Colorado State @ Indiana State – Indiana State W 65–60
 November 21: Southern Illinois @ UNLV – SIU L 69–78
 December 5: Air Force @ Missouri State – Missouri State W 58–48
 December 12: TCU @ Wichita State – Wichita State W 80–68
 December 19: Creighton @ New Mexico – New Mexico W 66–61
 December 19: Illinois State @ Utah – Illinois State W 73–63
 December 22: San Diego State @ Drake-San Diego State W 76–73 (OT)
 December 23: Wyoming @ Northern Iowa - Northern Iowa W 72–54

Conference season

Postseason

MVC Tournament

Conference awards & honors

Weekly awards
MVC Players of the Week
Throughout the conference season, the MVC offices name a player and newcomer of the week.

References

External links
MVC Official website
2009–10 MVC Men's Basketball on-line media guide